A phageome is a community of bacteriophages and their metagenomes localized in a particular environment, similar to a microbiome. The term was first used in an article by Modi et al in 2013 and has continued to be used in scientific articles that relate to bacteriophages and their metagenomes. A bacteriophage, or phage for short, is a virus that has the ability to infect bacteria and archaea, and can replicate inside of them. Phageome is a subcategory of virome, which is all of the viruses that are associated with a host or environment. Phages make up the majority of most viromes and are currently understood as being the most abundant organism. Oftentimes scientists will look only at a phageome instead of a virome while conducting research.

In humans 

Although bacteriophages do not have the capability to infect human cells, they are found in abundance in the human virome. 

The human gut phageome has recently become a topic of interest in the scientific community. The makeup of the gut phageome can be responsible for different gut related diseases such as IBD. The composition of phages that make up a healthy human gut phageome is currently debated, since different methods of research can lead to different results.

See also 
Virosphere

References 

Microbiology
Bacteriophages
Biology
Wikipedia Student Program
Microbiomes